Edward Lively (1586–1650) was an English politician who sat in the House of Commons for Berwick-upon-Tweed from 1624 to 1628.

References

1586 births
1650 deaths
English MPs 1624–1625
English MPs 1628–1629